Nesuh, meaning "clean" in Turkish, may refer to:

Nesuh Pasha
Nesuh Bey (Nesuh-beg)
Nesuh Voivoda
Nesuh Aga (Nesuh-aga)

Turkish words and phrases
Turkish given names